Nicholas Peverell (born 28 April 1973) is an English former footballer who played as a forward.

Born in Middlesbrough, Peverell played for York City when they beat Manchester United 3–0 at Old Trafford in the League Cup in 1995.

He later played for Gateshead, Bishop Auckland and Barrow, where his career was ended by a snapped Achilles. He later joined the coaching staff at Middlesbrough.

Notes

1973 births
Living people
Footballers from Middlesbrough
English footballers
Association football forwards
Middlesbrough F.C. players
Hartlepool United F.C. players
York City F.C. players
Gateshead F.C. players
Bishop Auckland F.C. players
Barrow A.F.C. players
English Football League players